Parliament TV may refer to the following legislature broadcasters:

 Parliament TV (Malta)
 Parliament TV (New Zealand), one of the Legislature broadcasters in New Zealand